Baikonur is a city in Kazakhstan rented by the Russian Federation for the Russian space program.

It can also be:

Places
 Baikonur (river), a river in Kazakhstan
 Baikonur (Karagandy Region), a mining town in Kazakhstan that lent its name to the space city.
 Baikonur Cosmodrome, a Russian-operated spaceport in the Kazakhstan city.
 Baikonur Krayniy Airport, one of the airports for Baikonur.
 Baikonur (Almaty Metro), a metro station in Almaty, Kazakhstan.
 2700 Baikonur, a minor planet.

Sports
 FC Baikonur, a football club from Kyzylorda, Kazakhstan.